Jimenez v. Quarterman, 555 U.S. 113 (2009), was a decision in which the Supreme Court of the United States held that under 28 U.S.C. § 2244(d)(1)(A), the conviction of a state defendant is not "final" if a state court grants an "out-of-time" appeal and the defendant has not yet filed a federal habeas petition.

Background
In 1996 the United States enacted the Antiterrorism and Effective Death Penalty Act, which among other provisions set strict limits on the ability of criminal defendants convicted in state courts to file a federal appeal. Under , an appeal had to be filed within one year from the time a judgment became "final."

Carlos Jimenez was convicted of burglary in the state of Texas in 1995. Jimenez appealed to the Texas Court of Appeals; his attorney filed a brief "explaining that he was unable to identify any nonfrivolous ground on which to base an appeal.". Through a miscommunication Jimenez never learned of this brief until well after the fact, and his appeal was dismissed on September 11, 1996. Jimenez appealed, and on September 25, 2002, the Texas Court of Criminal Appeals granted Jimenez the right to file a so-called "out-of-time" appeal, acknowledging that his original appeal was flawed. The court affirmed his conviction. Jimenez then filed a habeas petition with the District Court, which dismissed his appeal, arguing that the one-year time limit began on October 11, 1996, in the wake his first (flawed) appeal. Jimenez then appealed to the Court of Appeals, which upheld the District Court.

The Supreme Court granted certiorari.

Decision
In a unanimous opinion authored by Justice Thomas, the Supreme Court held that "the statute requires a federal court, presented with an individual's first petition for habeas relief, to make use of the date on which the entirety of the state direct appellate review process was completed" and that the granting of the right to an out-of-time appeal by the Texas Court of Appeals rendered Jimenez's conviction not final for the purposes of the statute.

The Court reversed the Court of Appeals and remanded the case.

See also
 List of United States Supreme Court cases, volume 555
 List of United States Supreme Court cases

References

External links
 

United States Supreme Court cases
2008 in United States case law
United States Supreme Court cases of the Roberts Court
Antiterrorism and Effective Death Penalty Act case law